Teresa Cristina may refer to:
Teresa Cristina (singer), born 1968
Teresa Cristina of the Two Sicilies, 1822–1889